The 1973 NCAA men's volleyball tournament was the fourth annual tournament to determine the national champion of NCAA men's college volleyball. The tournament took place at Peterson Gym on the campus of San Diego State University in San Diego, California. Like the previous year, the format of this championship consisted of a preliminary, four-team round robin to determine seeding for a subsequent single-elimination tournament. The round-robin seeding games were played on Friday, May 25 at Peterson Gym on the San Diego State campus. The semi-final and championship matches were held at the San Diego Sports Arena on Saturday, May 26.

Over 8,000 fans attended the championship match which, at the time, was the largest crowd ever to witness a volleyball match in the United States.

San Diego State defeated Long Beach State, 3–1 (11–15, 15–13, 15–8, 15–6), in the championship match to win their first national title. San Diego State's Duncan McFarland was named the Most Outstanding Player of the tournament.

Qualification
Until the creation of the NCAA Men's Division III Volleyball Championship in 2012, there was only a single national championship for men's volleyball. As such, all NCAA men's volleyball programs (whether from the University Division, or the College Division) were eligible. A total of 4 teams were invited to contest this championship.

Round robin

|}

Bracket 
Site: San Diego Sports Arena, San Diego, California

All tournament team 
Duncan McFarland, San Diego State (Most Outstanding Player)
Chris Marlowe, San Diego State
Randy Stevenson, San Diego State
Dodge Parker, Long Beach State
Miles Pabst, Long Beach State
Dave Schakel, Ball State

See also 
 NCAA Men's National Collegiate Volleyball Championship

References

1973
NCAA Men's Volleyball Championship
NCAA Men's Volleyball Championship
Volleyball in California
1973 in sports in California
May 1973 sports events in the United States